Note Worker is the fourth studio album by guitarist Frank Gambale, released in 1991 through Victor Entertainment.

Track listing

Personnel

Frank Gambale – vocals, guitar, keyboard (tracks 2, 3, 5), synthesizer (track 4), synthesizer melody (track 1), sequencing (track 1), keyboard bass (track 9), organ, scratching, background vocals (tracks 2, 3, 5), mixing, production
Freddie Ravel – keyboard (track 2), keyboard composition (track 7), clavinet, synthesizer (tracks 1, 3, 6, 8), string pads (track 5), strings (track 8), piano, horn effects (track 5)
Kei Akagi – keyboard composition (tracks 1, 6), keyboard strings (track 7), keyboard vibes (tracks 7, 8)
Dave Weckl – drums (tracks 1, 4–6), electronic drums (track 4)
Steve Smith – drums (tracks 2, 3, 7, 8)
Bob Harrison – bass (tracks 1, 5, 6)
Steve Kershisnik 1– bass (tracks 2, 7)
Tim Landers – bass (tracks 3, 8)
Steve Tavaglione – saxophone, EWI
Walt Fowler – flugelhorn
Anjani – background vocals (tracks 2, 3, 5)
Robert Read – engineering
Darron Mora – engineering
Bob Oullette – engineering
Frank Vendetti – engineering
Robert M. Biles – mixing
Tim Anderson – fading
Bernie Grundman – mastering
Akira Taguchi – executive production
Takashi Misu – executive production
Ron Moss – executive production

Chart performance

References

External links
Frank Gambale "Note Worker" album review at Guitar Nine

Frank Gambale albums
1991 albums
Victor Entertainment albums